The 190th (Winnipeg Rifles) Battalion, CEF was a unit in the Canadian Expeditionary Force during the First World War.  Based in Winnipeg, Manitoba, the unit began recruiting during the winter of 1915/16 in that city and surrounding district.  After sailing to England in May 1917, the battalion was absorbed into the 18th Reserve Battalion on May 14, 1917.  The 190th (Winnipeg Rifles) Battalion, CEF had one Officer Commanding: Lieut-Col. G. K. Watson.

This battalion is perpetuated by the Royal Winnipeg Rifles.

References

Meek, John F. Over the Top! The Canadian Infantry in the First World War. Orangeville, Ont.: The Author, 1971.

Battalions of the Canadian Expeditionary Force
Military units and formations of Manitoba